Lotyń  is a village in the administrative district of Gmina Okonek, within Złotów County, Greater Poland Voivodeship, in west-central Poland.

Before 1648, the area was part of Duchy of Pomerania, and from 1648 to 1945, it was part of Prussia and from 1871 Germany. For the history of the region, see history of Pomerania.

The village has a population of 1,000.

Notable residents
 Ewald Friedrich von Hertzberg (1725–1795), Prussian politician.

References

Villages in Złotów County